Noël Ferdinand Lionel Daunais,  (December 31, 1901 – July 18, 1982) was a French Canadian baritone and composer.

Life
Born in Montreal, Quebec, Daunais studied singing with Céline Marier and harmony and composition with Oscar O'Brien. In 1923 he won first prize at the Montreal Musical Festival. He made his professional opera debut in January 1926 as Ourrias in Charles Gounod's Mireille at the Orpheum in Vancouver. The following March he gave his first recital at the Ritz-Carlton Hotel.

Daunais was also awarded the Prix d'Europe in 1926 which provided him with the opportunity to pursue studies in Paris with Émile Marcellin at the Opéra-Comique. In 1929 he joined the roster of principal artists at the Opera of Algiers. With that company he sang several leading roles, including Escamillo in Carmen, Figaro in The Barber of Seville, Giorgio Germont in La traviata, Lescaut in Manon, and Valentin in Faust.

Upon his return to Canada in 1930, Daunais performed with the Bytown Troubadours at the third annual CPR Festivals in Quebec City. At the festival he also portrayed Samuel de Champlain in Healey Willan's The Order of Good Cheer. Later that year he made his debut with the Société canadienne d'opérette in Montreal as Clément Marot in André Messager's La Basoche. He performed frequently with that company through 1935. 
 
In 1932 Daunais founded the Trio lyrique (TL) whose original members also included contralto Anna Malenfant and tenor Ludovic Huot. Jules Jacob replaced Huot in the early 1940s. Daunais recruited pianist and composer Allan McIver to serve as the group's accompanist and arranger. All of the arrangements performed during the TL's performance history were by McIver, including arrangements of many of Daunais's compositions.

In 1933 the TL was engaged by CRBC for its network series One Hour with You, on which the group performed for 87 weeks. In the 1934 the TL released the LP album Chansons de Lionel Daunais for Radio Canada International. In 1936 the group performed for the CBS radio network in New York where McIver was also engaged as a staff arranger. The TL continued to perform actively in public concerts and on CBC Radio programs like The Play of the Week, Light Up and Listen. and Serenade for Strings up until the mid-1960s when it disbanded. The group re-united briefly in the autumn of 1971 for CBC broadcasts honoring Daunais and his work. In 1984 the album Le Trio lyrique chante Lionel Daunais was released; containing music from the ensemble's many radio broadcasts.

Honours
 In 1965, he was awarded the Bene merenti de patria.
 In 1977, he was awarded the Calixa-Lavallée Award.
 In 1978, he was made an Officer of the Order of Canada.
 In 1982, he was awarded the Prix Denise-Pelletier.

Discography (as a composer) 

12 Chansons The Canadian Encyclopedia
 Lionel Daunais, baritone
 John Newmark, piano
 Radio-Canada International, RCI 107
 1954

Transcription: Lionel Daunais Discogs.com
 Bruno Laplante, baritone
 Louis-Philippe Pelletier, piano
 Radio-Canada International, RCI 294
 1971

D’amour et de fantaisie Discogs.com
 Lionel Daunais, baritone
 John Newmark, piano
 Sélect, CC-15.087
 1974

Chansons de mon pays Discogs.com
 Ensemble Vocal Katimavik
 André Beaumier, choir conductor
 Société Nouvelle d’Enregistrement, SNE 502
 1979 (1977?)

Anna Malenfant chante Lionel Daunais Discogs.com
 Anna Malenfant, contralto
 Janine Lachance, piano
 Société Nouvelle d’Enregistrement, SNE 511
 1984

Lionel Daunais chante Lionel Daunais Discogs.com
 Lionel Daunais, baritone
 Janine Lachance and John Newmark, piano
 Société Nouvelle d’Enregistrement, SNE 512
 1984

Le Trio Lyrique chante Lionel Daunais Discogs.com
 Trio Lyrique
 Allan McIver, piano
 Société Nouvelle d’Enregistrement, SNE 513
 1984

Le Bestiaire Discogs.com
 Christine Lemelin, mezzo-soprano
 Réjean Coallier, piano
 Société Nouvelle d’Enregistrement, SNE 565
 1990

Lionel Daunais : L’hommage de ses interprètes Bibliothèque et Archives nationales du Québec
 Lionel Daunais, baritone
 Anna Malenfant, contralto
 Trio Lyrique
 Janine Lachance and John Newmark, piano
 Box set, 5 CDs
 Fonovox, VOX-7839-2
 1997

Airs Chantés – Fantaisie dans tous les tons Discogs.com
 Hélène Guilmette, soprano
 Delphine Bardin, piano
 Ambroisie, AMB 9971
 2004

Le petit chien de laine Allmusic.com
 Various performers
 Illustrated Book and CD
 La Montagne Secrète
 2005

Lionel Daunais : Fantaisie dans tous les tons Allmusic.com
 Chantal Lavigne, soprano
 Anne-Lise Longuemare, piano
 Atma Classique, ACD2 1016
 2009

Hommage à Lionel Daunais Allmusic.com
 Quatuor Kevoixsi
 CD Baby 5637680983
 2010

75 ans 75 chansons – Radio-Canada 1936-2011 Allmusic.com
 Box set, 5 CDs
 Disques SRC
 2011

La tourtière CMCCanada.org
 Jacqueline Woodley, soprano
 Annina Haug, mezzo-soprano
 Pierre Rancourt, baritone
 Marc Bourdeau, piano & arrangement
 CentreTracks, CD-CMCCT 11822
 2022 (4 February)

Le voyage de noces CMCCanada.org
 Pierre Rancourt, baritone
 Marc Bourdeau, piano & arrangement
 CentreTracks, CD-CMCCT 11922
 2022 (4 March)

Chanson des amours perdues CMCCanada.org
 Jacqueline Woodley, soprano
 Marc Bourdeau, piano
 CentreTracks, CD-CMCCT 12022
 2022 (18 March)

LIONEL DAUNAIS mélodies . songs CMCCanada.org
 Jacqueline Woodley, soprano
 Annina Haug, mezzo-soprano
 Pierre Rancourt, baritone
 Michel Bellavance, flute
 Marc Bourdeau, piano & arrangement
 CentreDiscs, CD-CMCCD 30122
 2022 (1 April)

See also
In Good Company album

References

1901 births
1982 deaths
Canadian male composers
Canadian operatic baritones
Officers of the Order of Canada
French Quebecers
Prix Denise-Pelletier winners
Singers from Montreal
20th-century Canadian male opera singers
20th-century Canadian composers